State Route 266 (SR 266) is a state highway in Middle Tennessee. The southern terminus is in a currently undeveloped section of Smyrna at an interchange with I-24. The northern terminus is in Lebanon at an intersection with US 70.

Route description

Rutherford County

SR 266 begins in Rutherford County in Smyrna at an interchange with I-24 (Exit 66). It goes east as a 4-lane, changing to a 6-lane, divided highway called Sam Ridley Parkway, a major thoroughfare featuring numerous strip malls, apartments, a high school, and a hospital. It has an interchange with US 41/US 70S/SR 1 (N Lowry Street) on the southern edge of Smyrna Airport. SR 266 then becomes undivided and continues east to an intersection with SR 102 (Nissan Drive), where Sam Ridley Parkway officially end and SR 266 continues east as Jefferson Pike. The highway then narrows to 2-lanes and crosses a bridge over the Stones River just south of Percy Priest Lake, where it leaves Smyrna. SR 266 then passes through rural areas to come to have an interchange with I-840 (Exit 61) before passing through Walterhill and having an intersection with US 231/SR 10. SR 266 then continues east through farmland to pass through Lascassas, where it has a short concurrency with SR 96 before turning northward and crossing into Wilson County.

Wilson County

SR 266 winds its way northward through farmland as Cainsville Road, where it passes through Norene and has an intersection with SR 265. The highway then enters Lebanon and passes through an industrial area and has an intersection with Maddox-Simpson Parkway before crossing an overpass over I-40. SR 266 continues north through industrial areas before entering downtown at an intersection with Tennessee Boulevard, where it becomes S College Street. It goes north to have an intersection with US 70 Bus./SR 24 (E Main Street), where it becomes  N College Street, before coming to an end at an intersection with US 70/SR 26 (E High Street) in a business district.

The Tennessee General Assembly, along with State Representative Mike Sparks and Senator Bill Ketron honored former Rutherford County Historian Ernie Johns by naming a section of Jefferson Pike, "Ernie Johns Honorary Highway." 

The Jefferson Pike section of highway from Sam Ridley Parkway to I-840 is in the process of being widened to a 4-lane highway.

History

For most of its length through Smyrna, Route 266 is a 4-lane, now changing to a 6-lane, highway called Sam Ridley Parkway, named for the mayor of the city from 1947 to 1987. (Sam Ridley was forced to resign in 1987 due to a conflict-of-interest suit; as a testament to his popularity, his identical twin brother Knox was promptly instated as mayor.) Once an undeveloped highway forming part of a beltway around Smyrna and serving the Smyrna Airport, Sam Ridley Parkway now features numerous Strip Malls, Apartments, and even a Hospital.

Major intersections

See also
List of Tennessee state highways

References

266